Ormenion (Ὀρμένιον) may refer to:
Ormenio, a village in Thrace, Greece
Ormenium, a town of ancient Thessaly, Greece